Oleg Yevgenyevich Shelyutov (born 16 August 1988) is a Russian former professional football player.

Club career
He played in the Russian Football National League for FC Dynamo Bryansk in 2010.

Personal life
He is the younger brother of Yevgeni Shelyutov.

External links
 
 Career summary at sportbox.ru
 

1988 births
Sportspeople from Bryansk
Living people
Russian footballers
Association football forwards
FC Dynamo Bryansk players